Andrew Dugald Daddo (born 18 February 1967) is an Australian actor, author and television and radio personality.

Early life
Daddo was born in Melbourne on 18 February 1967. He began his education at Mt Eliza Primary School and in year seven moved to Peninsula Grammar. After a short stint at the grammar school, the Daddo family moved away and continued his education at Millburn Junior High in New Jersey, USA. Returning to Australia, Daddo spent the last two and a half years of his schooling at Melbourne Grammar School. Daddo holds an Arts degree from Monash University.

Career
Andrew Daddo was a co-host of The Factory with Alex Papps, broadcast on ABC TV on Saturday mornings, from 1987 to 1989. He also hosted Countdown Revolution in 1989.

From 1989 to 1991, Daddo was a VJ on the American MTV network.

Daddo played characters in the children's series Round the Twist and Cluedo, both in 1992.

Daddo hosted the World's Greatest Commercials, which ran from 1995 to 1996, as well as Kidspeak, the Australian adaptation of Kids Say the Darndest Things. Daddo was a presenter on Seven's The Great Outdoors in 1994 and from 2002 to 2008. He was one of the travellers on the Globe Trekker series (also known as Lonely Planet) in 1994.

During the Sydney 2000 Olympics, Daddo and co-presenter Johanna Griggs presented Olympic Sunrise.

Daddo was the host of the television series The One which premiered on the Seven Network in July 2008. During the 2008 Beijing Olympics, Daddo hosted an Olympics-oriented morning talk show, Yum Cha.

Andrew was appointed as presenter of ABC Radio Sydney's evening program in February 2008. In May 2009, Daddo resigned from the ABC to co-host This Afternoon on the Nine Network which was axed after two and a half weeks on air due to poor ratings.

In 2009, Daddo was the narrator of the first series of The Apprentice Australia and has been the narrator of RBT: Random Breath Testing since 2010.

In 2015, Daddo was a contestant on the TV show: I'm a Celebrity...Get Me Out of Here!.

Author
Daddo has written books including  Flushed, Good Night Me, Youse Two, It's All Good, Muffin Top, Sprung Again, You're Dropped, Dacked and Stuff Happens: Ned.

Personal life 
Daddo currently resides in the Northern Beaches of Sydney where he is married to Jacquie and has three children. Daddo also has three brothers Lochie, Cameron and his identical twin brother, Jamie, who is an artist. He also has an older sister, Belinda.

Bibliography

Contributor

References

External links

1967 births
Living people
Australian male television actors
Australian television presenters
Australian people of Cornish descent
Australian people of Italian descent
I'm a Celebrity...Get Me Out of Here! (Australian TV series) participants
Male actors from Melbourne
People educated at Melbourne Grammar School
Monash University alumni
Australian twins
Twin male actors